Tempo Centar (formerly: Tempo Cash & Carry) is a Serbian hypermarket chain and a subsidiary of Ahold Delhaize.

History
Tempo was founded in 2003, with headquarters located in Belgrade, Serbia. The first Tempo store, with 8,000 m2 of floor space, opened in Belgrade in 2004. Three more Tempo Cash and Carry stores were built in 2006: one in Niš (floor space 6,000 m2), one in Novi Sad (floor space 6,000 m2) and another one in Belgrade (kvantas) (floor space 8,500 m2). All three new stores opened in December 2006.

The first Tempo (Viline Vode) was opened on July 15, 2004. It occupies a floor space of 5500 m2 and it is situated in the centre of Belgrade at Belgrade Harbour. After two years of work the end of 2006 was met by three newly built Tempo centers. The new concept for TEMPO Hypermarket was realized and managed by Marc Ernest Garofani as Chief Operations Officer.

Novi Sad Tempo was opened on December 1, 2006 at n.n. Tekelija street. This is the largest store in Vojvodina with a floor space of 12,000 m2. Inside the centre are a bank, a pharmacy, and a playroom for children. On December 8, 2006, only a week after opening the Tempo store in Novi Sad, a new Tempo store opened in Niš.

At the entrance of Niš, at 80, February 12 street, the biggest store in South Serbia has opened, with a floor space of 6.000 m2 and 30,000 consumer articles, a parking lot, bank and coffee bar. The opening of the biggest store in the Balkans was organized for December 22 in Belgrade.

Tempo centre at Block 53 Autoput I, the industrial zone of New Belgrade, occupies a total area of 18,000 square meters. In front of the store is a parking lot for 550 vehicles. Inside the building are a bank, a coffee bar and a playroom for children.

Goods can be paid in cash or by card: MasterCard, Visa, Dina, Yuba, or Diners.

Tempo stores are open 24 hours a day, including Sundays. They close only on public holidays like New Year's Day or Serbian Orthodox Christmas (January 7).
Tempo offers a wide and deep assortment of more than 40,000 SKUs.

In June 2012, Marc Ernest Garofani was appointed to the position of Director of TEMPO Hypermarkets.
November 26, 2013, a new Tempo hypermarket opened in Belgrade, Bacvanska street. The total area of the store is 5,000 square metres.
Today, Tempo banner is present in Belgrade, Novi Sad, Nis, Kragujevac, Kraljevo, Cacak, Uzice, Vrnjacka Banja, Niksic (Montenegro) and opened in April 2014 a 2500-square metre store in Sabac (Serbia).

Since August 2014, Maxi and Tempo is no longer operating in Bosnia and Herzegovina. The company Tropic Group from Banja Luka bought the ownership of 39 retail supermarkets (Tempo, Maxi) from Delhaize BiH.

Since April 2015, with renewal the object in Ada, Tempo Centar has used a new ident and logo (stylized as Tempo), with the change in ownership structure.

See also
 List of supermarket chains in Serbia

References

External links
 Official website

Ahold Delhaize
Retail companies established in 2003
Serbian brands
Supermarkets of Serbia